is a former Japanese AV idol and pink film actress.

Life and career
Mari Ayukawa was born in Tokyo on December 2, 1969. Ayukawa had nurse education in high school and she was a medical school student when she made her AV debut in the July 1988 Arena release, .

Ayukawa starred in the female pink film director Sachi Hamano's entry in Shintōhō Eiga's Molester's Train series, . Ayukawa also starred in director Akio Jissoji's  (1990), also distributed by Xces.

In 1991, Ayukawa played the role of the wife of Kuen the silk-maker in the Hong Kong Category III classic Sex and Zen.

In 2006, Ayukawa's AV career, which ran from 1988 to 1990, much of it for the h.m.p. and Alice Japan studios, was reviewed in the DVD Mari Ayukawa History, released by Atlas21.

Partial filmography

Notes

Bibliography
 
 
 
 
Filmography at HKMDB
 
AV filmography at Eropedia.jp

External links 
 

1969 births
Living people
Actresses from Tokyo
Japanese female adult models
Japanese pornographic film actresses
Hong Kong film actresses
Pink film actors